Ambrosio José Martín Cedres (born 30 April 1968) is a Spanish former handball player and current coach.

In the summer of 2012, he replaced Karl Erik Bøhn as head coach of Győri ETO KC. Contemporaneously with his job in Hungary, he has been also coaching the Romania women's national handball team since 4 October 2016. In February 2018 he announced, that he will not extend his contract with Győr and will leave the club at the end of the season. Between 2018 and 2020 he was the head coach of Rostov-Don. In May 2019 his contract at the Romanian national team was terminated on mutual consent. In August 2019 he replaced Yevgeni Trefilov as the head coach of the Russian national team. On 31 July 2020 it was announced that his contract with Rostov-Don was terminated on mutual consent.

Martín was the first Spanish coach to win the Champions League trophy with a foreign club. He was named Coach of the Year in the Women's EHF Champions League for four straight years (2015–2018).

International honours

Player
Cadagua Gáldar
EHF City Cup:
Runner-up: 1995

SDC San Antonio
EHF Champions League:
Winner: 2001
Runner-up: 2003
EHF Supercup:
Winner: 2000
Runner-up: 2001
EHF Cup Winners' Cup:
Winner: 2000

Manager 
Russia
World Championship:
Bronze medal: 2019

Rostov
Women's EHF Champions League:
Runner-up: 2019

Győr
Women's EHF Champions League:
Winner: 2013, 2014, 2017, 2018
Runner-up: 2016, 2022
Bronze medal: 2021

Itxako
Women's EHF Champions League:
Runner-up: 2011
Women's EHF Cup:
Winner: 2009
Runner-up: 2008

Individual
 Women's EHF Champions League Best Coach: 2014–15, 2015–16, 2016–17, 2017–18, 2021–22

References

External links

1968 births
Living people
Spanish male handball players
Liga ASOBAL players
SDC San Antonio players
Spanish handball coaches
Spanish expatriate sportspeople in Hungary
Spanish expatriate sportspeople in Romania
Spanish expatriate sportspeople in Russia
People from Arrecife
Sportspeople from the Province of Las Palmas
Expatriate handball players
Handball coaches of international teams